Kathleen Richardson, Baroness Richardson of Calow (born 1938), is an English political figure.

Kathleen Richardson may also refer to:

Kathleen M. Richardson (born 1927), Canadian philanthropist and arts patron
Kathleen Richardson (camogie), played in All-Ireland Senior Club Camogie Championship 1969
Kathleen A. Richardson, American professor of optics
Kathleen Richardson (mountaineer), British mountain climber

See also
Kat Richardson, an American author
Kate Richardson (disambiguation)
Katherine Richardson (disambiguation)